The mathematician Alexander Grothendieck (1928–2014) is the eponym of many things.

Mathematics 

Grothendieck